Carabus absonus is a species of ground beetle in the large genus Carabus.

References

absonus
Insects described in 2005